Kim Hae-sook (born December 30, 1955) is a South Korean actress.

Career
In 1974, she made her acting debut in MBC's Chief Inspector. Over the past decade, she has won over 10 awards and appeared in over 30 films. Kim Hae-sook has published a book entitled "Mother of Hallyu Stars: Kim Hae-sook's Story".

Filmography

Film

Television series

Web series

Book

Awards and nominations

State honors

Notes

References

External links
 
 
 

1955 births
Living people
20th-century South Korean actresses
21st-century South Korean actresses
South Korean film actresses
South Korean television actresses
People from Busan